Teodor Atanasov (born 25 September 1987) is a Bulgarian footballer, currently playing for Dimitrovgrad as a striker. Atanasov is 1.90 m tall and weighs 80 kg.

Career
Born in Haskovo, Atanasov start to play football in local club PFC Haskovo. On 18-years old he signed with Hebros Harmanli and played one season with the team in Bulgarian amateur division.

In the summer of 2006 Teodor moved to Germany for his higher education and during that time played in the Oberliga Bayern for Kickers Würzburg.

In the winter of 2008 Atanasov returned to Bulgaria. He was invited by Cherno More Varna to join trial period, which began in January 2008. In March 2008 the forward signed a contract for three years with the club from Varna. He was given the No.16 shirt. In his first months with "the sailors"  Teo often scored goals in friendly matches and for the reserves squad, but did not play for the first team. On 31 July he made his official debut for the club in the 2nd leg in the UEFA Cup against Andorran club UE Sant Julià on Estadi Communal in Aixovall. On 22 September 2008 Atanasov made his official debut in the Bulgarian top division in a match against Lokomotiv Plovdiv as a 78th-minute substitute.

External links
 footmercato profile

1987 births
Living people
Bulgarian footballers
First Professional Football League (Bulgaria) players
Association football forwards
PFC Cherno More Varna players
People from Haskovo
Sportspeople from Haskovo Province